Salam Bappu is an Indian film director working in Malayalam cinema. He made his debut through the movie Red Wine (2013) and later directed Manglish new movie ‘’Aayirothonnaam Raavu’’ shoot progressing at Dubai

Biography
Salam Bappu was born on 15 May 1975 at Palapetty, a village in Ponnani, Malappuram, Kerala to Bappu Haji and Ayishumma.

After his schooling at Govt High School Palapetty, he pursued his graduation from M.E.S. Ponnani College, Ponnani (1992-1995), and Kerala Law Academy Law College, Trivandrum (1997-2000). Also, he holds a Post graduate diploma in Journalism from Institute of Journalism, Press Club Trivandrum (2001). He enrolled  as advocate from Kerala High court, Kochi and practiced as an advocate at Ponnani bar. He worked as a script writer in Asianet.

He started his film career in 2001 as an assistant to Malayalam director Lal Jose. Meesha madhavan (2002), Pattalam(2003), Rasikan (2004), Chandu pottu (2005), Aparichithan (2003), Achanurangatha veedu (2006), Classmates (2006),  Arabhi kadha (2007), Mulla (2008), Neelathamara (2009), Kerala Cafe (2009) Elsamma enna aankutty (2010), Spanish masala (2012), Diamond Necklace (2012), Ayaalum Njaanum Thammil (2012), Kaanchipurathe Kalyanam, Kallanum Polisum, Thaavalam, Maharaja Talkies, Vadhyaar, Oridathoru postman and Arjunan Saakshi are some of the films that he worked on as an associate. Salam Bappu  holds the credit of co-directing a Bangladeshi film namely, "Eytho Prem". Apart from this Bangladeshi film, he played a role in the making of an Omani film named "Aseel". It was the second movie ever made in Oman.

His debut as an independent director was marked by the release of the movie Red Wine, starred Mohanlal, Fahadh Faasil, and Asif Ali. His second movie is Manglish casting Mammootty, Holland actress Caroline bech, Vinay fort, Tiny tom. He acted three Malayalam movies named Kappela (2020), Cabin (2021), Mission C (2021). He scripted a Kannada movie named "Srikrishna@gmail.com". He was the Vice President of Fefka Director's union.

Filmography

References

https://indianexpress.com/article/entertainment/malayalam/shane-nigam-salam-bappu-next-titled-aayirathonnam-raav-7861065/lite/

External links
 

Malayalam film directors
Living people
Date of birth missing (living people)
21st-century Indian film directors
Film directors from Kerala
People from Malappuram
Year of birth missing (living people)